Grau Records is a record label based in Germany. The label specializes in underground metal music.

BandsGrau Records official website

Current bands
Fall of Empyrean
Longing for Dawn
Mael Mórdha
Mandrake
Mourning Beloveth

Former bands
Agalloch
The Blue Season
Gardens of Gehenna
Keen of the Crow
Saturnus
Von Branden

References

Music publishing companies of Germany
Death metal record labels
Doom metal record labels
Heavy metal record labels